was a fudai feudal domain under the Tokugawa shogunate of  Edo period Japan.  It was located in Mino Province, in the Tōkai region of central Honshu. The domain was centered at Ōgaki Castle, in what is now the city of Ōgaki in Gifu Prefecture. It was ruled for most of its existence by the Toda clan.

History
Ōgaki is located at a strategic point on the road from Mino Province to Ōmi Province and Kyoto and was hotly contested in the Sengoku period between Saitō Dōsan and Oda Nobuhide. Under Oda Nobunaga, Ujiie Naotomo followed by his son Ujiie Naomasa ruled the area. Under Toyotomi Hideyoshi, the area was entrusted to Ikeda Tsuneoki, Toyotomi Hidetsugu, Toyotomi Hidenaga, Katō Mitsuyasu, Hitotsuyanagi Naosuke, Toyotomi Hidekatsu and finally to Itō Morimasa. In 1600, Itō Morimasa was daimyō of a 30,000 koku domain, which was a problem for Tokugawa Ieyasu since Itō was a staunch supporter of Ishida Mitsunari and Ōgaki was a very short distance from Sekigahara. However, Itō also proved to be an inept commander and failed to attack the Tokugawa armies when they were the most vulnerable, and as a result was dispossessed after the Battle of Sekigahara.

In 1601, Tokugawa Ieyasu established Ōgaki Domain, installing Ishikawa Yasumichi as daimyō with a kokudaka of 50,000 koku. The Ishikawa clan were transferred to Hita Domain in Bungo Province in 1616 as a reward for their services at the Battle of Osaka. They were replaced by a cadet branch of the Hisamatsu-Matsudaira from 1616 to 1624, followed by the Okabe clan from 1624 to 1633, and then by another cadet branch of  the Hisamatsu-Matsudaira from 1633 to 1635.

In 1635, Toda Ujikane was transferred to Ōgaki from Amagasaki Domain in Settsu Province, and the kokudaka of the domain was increased to 100,000 koku. The Toda clan would continue to rule Ōgaki until the Meiji restoration.

Toda Ujikane was instrumental in opening new rice fields, irrigation and flood control measures, planting of forests and reforming the renumeration system for his retainers. He also maintained Ōgaki Castle. under the 3rd daimyō , Toda Ujisada, 3000 koku of new rice fields were given to his brother, Toda Ujishige, which when combined with the 7000 koku already under his name, placed him over the threshold to become daimyō of a cadet domain, the Ōgaki Shinden Domain. This sub-domain would also endure to the Meiji restoration. The 6th daimyō, Toda Ujihide, attempted to implement fiscal reforms, which failed due to a peasant's revolt in 1766. The 7th daimyō, Toda Ujinori, served as a rōjū under Tokugawa Ienari during a time of increasing Russian incursions into Japanese northern waters. The 8th daimyō, Toda Ujitsune, founded the han school, "Chidokan" in 1840. The 9th daimyō, Toda Ujimasa reformed the domain's military in 1856. The  10th daimyō, Toda Ujiakira attempted further reforms, but was frustrated by the Ansei Purge. The final daimyō, Toda Ujitaka was branded an "enemy of the crown" after the Battle of Toba-Fushimi in the Boshin War, but was able to defect to the imperial side and served as messenger of the court to other domains along the Tōsandō to urge them to submit. He was later awarded a 30,000 koku increase by the Meiji government, but soon afterwards Ōgaki Domain became Ōgaki Prefecture due to the abolition of the han system, and was then absorbed into the new Gifu Prefecture.

Bakumatsu period holdings
As with most domains in the han system, Ōgaki Domain consisted of several discontinuous territories calculated to provide the assigned kokudaka, based on periodic cadastral surveys and projected agricultural yields.

Mino Province 
 12 villages in Ishizu District
 24 villages in Tagi District
 10 villages in Fuwa District
 90 villages in Anpachi District
 53 villages in Ikeda District
 45 villages in Ōno District
 31 villages in Motosu District
 2 villages in Katagata District

List of daimyō

See also
List of Han

References
The content of this article was largely derived from that of the corresponding article on Japanese Wikipedia.

Notes

Domains of Japan
1601 establishments in Japan
History of Gifu Prefecture
Mino Province